Louis de Bourbon, or Louis III, Prince of Condé (10 November 1668 – 4 March 1710), was a prince du sang as a member of the reigning House of Bourbon at the French court of Louis XIV. Styled as the Duke of Bourbon from birth, he succeeded his father as Prince of Condé in 1709; however, he was still known by the ducal title. He was prince for less than a year.

Biography

Louis de Bourbon, duc de Bourbon, duc de Montmorency (1668–1689), duc d'Enghien (1689–1709), 6th Prince of Condé, comte de Sancerre (1709–1710), comte de Charolais (1709), was born at the Hôtel de Condé in Paris on 10 November 1668 and died at the Palace of Versailles on 4 March 1710. He was the eldest son of Henri Jules de Bourbon, Prince of Condé and Anne Henriette of Bavaria, and the grandson of le Grand Condé.

One of nine children, he was his parents' eldest surviving son. His sister, Marie Thérèse de Bourbon, married François Louis, Prince of Conti in 1688. Another sister, Louise Bénédicte de Bourbon, would marry Louis Auguste, Duke of Maine, a legitimised son of Louis XIV, in 1692. His youngest sister, Marie Anne de Bourbon, much later married the famous general Louis Joseph de Bourbon.

He was made a Chevalier du Saint-Esprit in 1686, a colonel of the Bourbon-Infanterie Regiment later that same year, a maréchal de camp in 1690, and a lieutenant general in 1692. Upon the death of his father, he inherited all the Condé titles and estates.

Marriage
In 1685, Louis married Louise Françoise de Bourbon, known at court as Mademoiselle de Nantes, who was the eldest legitimised daughter of King Louis XIV of France and his mistress, Madame de Montespan. In an age where dynastic considerations played a major role, eyebrows at court were raised at a marriage between a full-blooded prince du sang and a royal bastard. The head of the House of Condé, le Grand Condé, however, acquiesced to the socially inferior match in the hope of gaining favour with the bride's father, Louis XIV.

The seventeen-year-old duc de Bourbon was known at court as Monsieur le Duc. After the marriage, his wife assumed the style of Madame la Duchesse. Like his father, who became Prince of Condé in 1687, Louis de Bourbon led a typical, unremarkable life. At a time when five-and-a-half feet was considered a normal height for a woman, Louis, while not quite a dwarf, was considered a short man. His sisters, in fact, were so tiny that they were referred to as "dolls of the Blood", or, less flatteringly, as "little black beetles" since many of them were dark in complexion and hunchbacked. While not suffering from this condition himself, Louis was macrocephalic. In addition, his skin tone was said to have a definite yellowish-orange tint to it. On the plus side, while no scholar, Louis was respectably well educated. Similarly, while certainly no fool, he was not burdened with too much intelligence for his time and station in life.

Prince of Condé

Louis was prince de Condé for a little less than a year, as he died only eleven months after his father. Like his father, Louis was hopelessly insane, having slipped into madness several years before his actual death, "making horrible faces", as one historian noted. Louis died in 1710 at the age of 41.

Issue
Marie Anne Éléonore de Bourbon, Mademoiselle de Bourbon (22 December 1690 - 30 August 1760); became a nun.
Louis Henri I, Prince of Condé (18 August 1692 - 27 January 1740); married Marie Anne de Bourbon and had no issue. He later married Landgravine Caroline of Hesse-Rotenburg and had issue.
Louise Élisabeth de Bourbon (22 November 1693 – 27 May 1775); married Louis Armand, Prince of Conti and had issue.
Louise Anne de Bourbon, Mademoiselle de Charolais (23 June 1695 - 8 April 1758); died unmarried.
Marie Anne de Bourbon (16 October 1697 - 11 August 1741); secretly married Louis de Melun, Duke of Joyeuse.
Charles, Count of Charolais (19 June 1700 - 23 July 1760); secretly married Jeanne de Valois Saint Remy (descendant of Henri II of France) and had illegitimate issue.
Henriette Louise de Bourbon, Mademoiselle de Vermandois (15 January 1703 - 19 September 1772); died unmarried.
Élisabeth Alexandrine de Bourbon, Mademoiselle de Sens (15 September 1705 - 15 April 1765); died unmarried.
Louis, Count of Clermont (15 June 1709 - 16 June 1771); died unmarried.

Ancestry

References

External links

Princes of France (Bourbon)
Princes of Condé
Dukes of Enghien
Louis
203
Nobility from Paris
Conde, Louis III, Prince of
Conde, Louis III, Prince of
Grand Masters of France
17th-century peers of France
18th-century peers of France
Dukes of Châteauroux